The AMD 800 chipset series is a set of chipsets developed by AMD, released in 2009. The chipset series was revealed in its presentation slides during the AMD Financial Analyst Day 2007 held on December 13, 2007. This chipset series also marks the return of AMD to the workstation/server market after the completion of the ATI acquisition in October 2006 with the first server chipsets.

Lineup

Server
The chipset series is targeted in three markets: the workstation/server market, the desktop market and the notebook market. Current information about the chipset series is very scarce, while the officially published information about the series is the server chipsets with two variants available, the AMD 890S chipset and the AMD 870S chipset, all of them paired with the SB700S series southbridge. The chipsets were supposed to support the codenamed "Montreal" processor made on 45 nm process, in Socket G3 package, supporting both unbuffered or buffered DDR3 (with Socket G3MX), HyperTransport 3.0 and IOMMU, all of them forming the codenamed "Piranha" server platform. However, as a result of shifted strategy, AMD abandoned plans for Socket G3 and G3MX completely and focused to deliver new server platforms. Also for uni-processor server platform, the combination of SR5580 (Originally codenamed "RS780") and SP5100 formed the codenamed "Catalunya" platform.

The codenamed "Fiorano" platform consists of codenamed "Istanbul" six-core processors, while "Istanbul" processors still feature Socket F+ and support dual-channel registered DDR2 memory, the platform supports HyperTransport 3.0 and IOMMU.

The codenamed "Maranello" platform consists of six-core "Sao Paulo" or twelve-core "Magny-Cours" processors. These two processors support a new socket called Socket G34 with four-channel DDR3 support, with other platform features such as HyperTransport 3.0 and IOMMU support.

The codenamed "Catalunya" platform consists of codenamed "Suzuka" quad-core processors, featuring Socket AM3 and support dual-channel registered DDR3 memory, the platform supports HyperTransport 3.0.

The codenames of the chipsets "RD890S", "RD870S" and "SB700S" has also changed to "SR5690", "SR5670" and "SP5100".

Desktop and Mobile

890FX
 Codenamed RD890
 Single AMD processor configuration
 Four physical PCIe 2.0 x16 slots @ x8 electrical which can be combined to create two PCIe 2.0 x16 slots @ x16 electrical, one PCIe 2.0 x4 slot and 6 PCIe 2.0 x1 slots, the chipset provides a total of 42 PCIe 2.0 lanes and 4 PCIe 2.0 for A-Link Express III solely in the Northbridge
 HyperTransport 3.0 and PCI Express 2.0
 ATI CrossFireX
 AMD OverDrive
 IOMMU
 Pairs with SB850 southbridge with support up to six SATA 6.0 Gbit/s ports
 Enthusiast discrete multi-graphics segment

890GX
 Codenamed RS880D
 Single AMD processor configuration
 Two physical PCIe 2.0 x16 slots (one @ x16 or two @ x8 in Crossfire mode), one PCIe 2.0 x4 slot and two PCIe 2.0 x1 slots, the chipset provides a total of 22 PCIe 2.0 lanes and 4 PCIe 2.0 for A-Link Express III solely in the Northbridge
 Integrated graphics: Radeon HD 4290 
 Side-port memory as local framebuffer, supporting DDR3 chips up to DDR3-1333.
 ATI PowerPlay technology
 Two physical PCI-E x16 slots (one 16x and one 8x electrically. In Crossfire mode, both will revert to 8x electrically)
 HyperTransport 3.0 and PCI Express 2.0
 ATI CrossFire
 Hybrid CrossFireX
 AMD OverDrive
 Performance hybrid multi-graphics segment

880G
 Codenamed RS880
 Single AMD processor configuration
 One physical PCIe 2.0 x16 slot, one PCIe 2.0 x4 slot and two PCIe 2.0 x1 slots, the chipset provides a total of 22 PCIe 2.0 lanes and 4 PCIe 2.0 for A-Link Express III solely in the Northbridge
 Integrated graphics: Radeon HD 4250
 Side-port memory as local framebuffer, supporting DDR3 modules up to DDR3-1333.
 ATI PowerPlay 7.0 technology
 HyperTransport 3.0 and PCI Express 2.0
 ATI CrossFire
 Hybrid CrossFireX

870
 Codenamed RX880
 Single AMD processor configuration
 One physical PCIe 2.0 x16 slot, one PCIe 2.0 x4 slot and two PCIe 2.0 x1 slots, the chipset provides a total of 22 PCIe 2.0 lanes and 4 PCIe 2.0 for A-Link Express III solely in the Northbridge
 HyperTransport 3.0 and PCI Express 2.0

Southbridges
While in the same internal event mentioned above, AMD gave a preview on the features of the SB8xx family of southbridges, as follows:
 "A-Link Express 3.0" now uses four PCI Express 2.0 lanes, providing 2 GB/s bandwidth
 Supports C6 power state, which is featured in Fusion processors
 Incorporates a Gigabit Ethernet MAC
 Supports an integrated clock generator as an optional feature
 Support for AHCI 1.2 with SATA FIS–based switching support
 Mandatory support for SATA 1.5 Gbit/s, 3.0 Gbit/s, and SATA 6.0 Gbit/s (no support for Sata 6.0 Gbit/s in SB810)
 Two embedded 8051 controllers, and one dedicated for DASH compliance
 Support for 14 USB 2.0 ports, 2 USB 1.1 ports, and 3 integrated EHCI controllers (no support for USB 3.0 in initial products)
 Supports 5 fan controls, 8 Vin and 4 Tempin for hardware monitoring

Features

Desktop comparison matrix

Integrated graphics
Some members of the AMD 800 chipset series, the 880G and the 890GX have integrated graphics (IGP) that support hardware video playback acceleration at different levels. The IGP features are listed below:

Southbridge issues (SB8x0)
AMD does not provide any SB8x0 errata publicly.  Most OSes require patches in order to work reliably.
 Windows platform:
 Microsoft KB982091 
 Linux platform:
 HPET operation with MSI causes LPC DMA corruption on devices using LPC DMA (floppy, parallel port, serial port in FIR mode) because MSI requests are misinterpreted as DMA cycles by the broken LPC controller 
 SATA soft reset fails when PMP is enabled and attached devices will not be detected

See also
 AMD 700 chipset series
 AMD 900 chipset series
 List of AMD chipsets

References

External links
AMD chipsets page
AMD Server platform codenamed "Fiorano"
AMD 8-Series Chipset
AMD 800 Chipset Limitations
AMD Chipsets for Desktop PCs
AMD 890FX Databook

AMD chipsets